This Time Next Year may refer to:

 This Time Next Year (album), a 2000 album by The Movielife
 This Time Next Year (band), an American pop punk/melodic hardcore band
 This Time Next Year (British TV series), a British television series presented by Davina McCall
 This Time Next Year (Australian TV series), an Australian television series presented by Karl Stefanovic

See also
 Same Time, Next Year (disambiguation)